John Starr may refer to:
John Starr (politician) (1775–1827), merchant and politician in Nova Scotia, Canada
John Starr (physician), British geriatrician
John Robert Starr (1927–2000), American journalist
John Leander Starr (1802–1885), Canadian businessman and politician
John F. Starr (1818–1904), U.S. Representative from New Jersey
John Howard Starr (1898–1989), head coach of the Colgate University hockey team
John Renshaw Starr (1908–1996), artist and SOE agent in WWII
John Wellington Starr (1822–1856), American inventor and pioneer in development of the incandescent light bulb
The Time Commander, a DC comics supervillain
Pen name of writer Hugh B. Cave

See also
Jack Starr (born 1950), blues and metal guitarist. Former member of Virgin Steele
Jack Starr (Texas guitarist), outsider musician